India competed at the 2017 World Games in Wroclaw, Poland, from July 20, 2017, to July 30, 2017.

India had sent a delegation of 5 Athletes (1 Female, 4 Males) to compete in 4 Sports, but failed to win any medal.

Competitors

Archery 

India has qualified at the 2017 World Games with one male athlete, Abhishek Verma who got the pass due to having placed 10th in World Ranking list.

Billiards Sports 
Defending champion in Men's Singles Aditya Mehta is the only Indian qualified for the Games. A

Dance Sports

Sumo

References 

Nations at the 2017 World Games
2017
2017 in Indian sport